Miami is the first album from Belgian solo act The Go Find, released in 2004 by Morr Music.

Track listing
"Over the Edge" – 4:18
"Summer Quest" – 5:00
"City Dreamer" – 2:54
"What I Want" – 3:46
"Sky Window" – 4:12
"Bleeding Heart" – 3:54
"Modern Times" – 2:58
"The Party" – 2:12
"Igloo" – 3:36
"Blisters on My Thumb" – 3:52

2004 albums
The Go Find albums
Morr Music albums